The 2022 Oklahoma Sooners baseball team represents the University of Oklahoma during the 2022 NCAA Division I baseball season.
The Sooners play their home games at L. Dale Mitchell Baseball Park as a member of the Big 12 Conference. They are led by head coach Skip Johnson, in his 5th season at Oklahoma.

Previous season 
The 2021 team finished the season with a 27–28 record and an 11–13 record in the Big 12. In the 2021 Big 12 Conference baseball tournament, the fifth-seeded Sooners fell to fourth-seeded Oklahoma State 5–9 and top-seeded Texas 1–4 to end their conference tournament in the First Round. The Sooners did not earn an at-large bid to the 2021 NCAA Division I baseball tournament.

Personnel

Coaching staff

Roster

Schedule and results

Rankings

References

Oklahoma Sooners
Oklahoma Sooners baseball seasons
Oklahoma Sooners baseball
College World Series seasons
Oklahoma